Porridge is a food made by heating or boiling ground, crushed or chopped starchy plants, typically grain, in milk or water. It is often cooked or served with added flavourings such as sugar, honey, (dried) fruit or syrup to make a sweet cereal, or it can be mixed with spices, meat or vegetables to make a savoury dish. It is usually served hot in a bowl, depending on its consistency. Oat porridge, or oatmeal, is one of the most common types of porridge. Gruel is a thinner version of porridge.

Type of grains

The term "porridge" is often used specifically for oat porridge (oatmeal), which is typically eaten for breakfast with salt, sugar, fruit, milk, cream or butter and sometimes other flavourings. Oat porridge is also sold in ready-made or partly cooked form as an instant breakfast.

Other grains used for porridge include rice, wheat, barley, corn, triticale and buckwheat. Many types of porridge have their own names, such as congee, polenta, grits and kasha.

Conventional uses
Porridge is eaten for any meal of the day and porridge is also eaten in many cultures as a common snack and is often eaten by athletes.

Nutrition

Unenriched porridge (as oatmeal), cooked by boiling or microwave, is 84% water, and contains 12% carbohydrates, including 2% dietary fiber and 2% each of protein and fat (table). In a 100 gram reference amount, cooked porridge provides 71 Calories and contains 29% of the Daily Value (DV) for manganese and moderate content of phosphorus and zinc (11% DV each), with no other micronutrients in significant content (table).

Health effect
A 2014 review found that daily intake of at least 3 grams of oat beta-glucan lowers total and low-density lipoprotein cholesterol levels by 5–10% in people with normal or elevated blood cholesterol levels. Beta-glucan lowers cholesterol by inhibiting cholesterol production, although cholesterol reduction is greater in people with higher total cholesterol and LDL cholesterol in their blood. In the United States, the Food and Drug Administration issued a final ruling in 2015 stating that food companies can make health claims on food labels for products containing soluble fiber from whole oats (oat bran, oat flour and rolled oats), noting that 3.0 grams of soluble fiber daily from these foods may reduce the risk of heart disease. To qualify for the health claim, the food that contains the oats must provide at least 0.75 grams of soluble fiber per serving.

Varieties

Maize
 Maize porridge:
Atole, a Mexican dish of corn flour in water or milk.
 Champurrado (a chocolate-based atole), a Mexican blend of sugar, milk, chocolate and corn dough or corn flour. The Philippine dish tsampurado is similar, with rice instead of maize.
 Cir, păsat or (when firmer) mămăligă are all Romanian maize porridges.
 Colada, a hot dish prepared with corn starch, milk, sugar and cinnamon in Colombia and Ecuador.
 Cornmeal mush, a traditional dish in southern and mid-Atlantic US states.
 Cornmeal porridge (parrige), a traditional dish served for breakfast throughout the Caribbean and among Rastafarians. A blend of fine semolina with milk or water and often with all spice and sugar.
 Farina or papilla, a traditional Dominican dish of porridge maize or grass peas.
 Gachas, a Spanish porridge of maize or grass peas. Often garnished with roasted almonds and croutons of bread fried in olive oil.
 Gofio, a Canary Islands porridge of toasted coarse-ground maize. Made from roasted sweetcorn and other grains (e.g., wheat, barley or oats), used in many ways in parts of the world from which Canary Islanders have emigrated.
 Grits, ground hominy, is common in the southern United States, traditionally served with butter, salt and black pepper. Sometimes, it is also served with cheese.
 Kačamak, a maize porridge from the Balkans.
 Kānga pirau, a fermented corn porridge dish that is made and consumed by the Māori people of New Zealand
 Mazamorra, a maize porridge from Colombia's Paisa region made with whole maize grains that can be sweet or salty.
 Polenta, an Italian maize porridge which is cooked to a solidified state and sliced for serving.
 Rubaboo is made from dried maize and peas with animal fat and was a staple food of the Voyageurs.
 Shuco, a Salvadoran dish of black, blue or purple corn flour, ground pumpkin seeds, chili sauce and red cooked kidney beans, which was traditionally drunk out of a hollowed-out gourd at early morning, especially coming from a hunting or drinking trip.
 Suppawn, also called, and better known as, hasty pudding, was common in American colonial times and consisted of cornmeal boiled with milk into a thick porridge. Still eaten in modern times, it is no longer necessarily corn-based.
 Uji, a thick East African porridge made most commonly from corn flour mixed with sorghum and many other different ground cereals, with milk or butter and sugar or salt. Ugali, a more solid meal, is also made from maize flour, likewise often mixed with other cereals. These two, under various names, are staple foods over a wide part of the African continent, e.g., pap in South Africa, sadza or isitshwala in Zimbabwe, nshima in Zambia, tuwo or ogi in Nigeria, etc., though some of these may also be made from sorghum.
 Žganci, a maize porridge prepared in the Kajkavian countries and Slovenia.
 Mielie pap is a maize porridge staple in South African cuisine.

Millet

 Millet porridge:
 Foxtail millet porridge is a staple food in northern China.
 A porridge made from pearl millet is the staple food in Niger and surrounding regions of the Sahel.
 Oshifima or otjifima, a stiff pearl millet porridge, is the staple food of northern Namibia.
 Middle Eastern millet porridge, often seasoned with cumin and honey.
 Munchiro sayo, a millet porridge eaten by the Ainu, a native people of northern Japan.
 Milium in aqua was a millet porridge made with goat's milk that was eaten in ancient Rome.
 A ragi porridge, by name 'jaava' is consumed as a breakfast item during summer season in the Telugu speaking region of India
 Koozh is a millet porridge commonly sold in Tamil Nadu.

Oat

  Oat porridge, traditional and common in the English-speaking world, Germany and the Nordic countries. Oat porridge has been found in the stomachs of 5,000-year-old Neolithic bog bodies in Central Europe and Scandinavia. Varieties of oat porridge include:
 Groats, a porridge made from unprocessed oats or wheat.
 Gruel, very thin porridge, often drunk rather than eaten.
 Yod Kerc'h, a traditional oat porridge from the north-west of France, primarily Brittany, made with oats, butter and water or milk.
 Owsianka, an east European (Russia, Poland, Belarus, Ukraine) traditional breakfast made with hot milk, oats and sometimes with sugar and butter.
 Porridge made from rolled oats or ground oatmeal is common in the UK, Ireland, Australia, New Zealand, North America, Finland and Scandinavia. It is known as simply "porridge" or, more commonly in the United States and Canada, "oatmeal". In the US, oat and wheat porridge can both be called "hot cereal". Rolled oats are commonly used in England, oatmeal in Scotland and steel-cut oats in Ireland. In the Royal Navy during the Napoleonic Wars, cooks made burgoo for the men for breakfast, from coarse oatmeal and water.
 Porridge (Parrige) – Anglophone Caribbean (Guyana, Jamaica, Trinidad etc.) Also known as Pap. The most common type is corn meal, and they are always made with milk. Varieties include oatmeal, grated green plantain, barley, cream of wheat, sago (tapioca). Oatmeal porridge is often flavoured with cinnamon, nutmeg, brown sugar or almond essence.
 Stirabout – Irish porridge, traditionally made by stirring oats into boiling water
 Terci de ovăz, traditional oatmeal in Romania.
 Zabkása, traditional oatmeal in Hungary.

Types of oats

Oats for porridge may be whole (groats), cut into two or three pieces (called "pinhead", "steel-cut" or "coarse" oatmeal), ground into medium or fine oatmeal or steamed and rolled into flakes of varying sizes and thicknesses (called "rolled oats", the largest size being "jumbo"). The larger the pieces of oat used, the more textured the resulting porridge. It is said that, because of their size and shape, the body breaks steel-cut oats down more slowly than rolled oats, reducing spikes in blood sugar and making the eater feel full longer. The US Consumer Reports Web site found that the more cooking required, the stronger the oat flavor and the less mushy the texture.

Oats are a good source of dietary fibre; health benefits are claimed for oat bran in particular, which is part of the grain.

Preparation
The oats are cooked in milk, water or a mixture of the two. Scottish traditionalists allow only oats, water and salt. There are techniques suggested by cooks, such as presoaking, but a comparative test found little difference in the end result. Various flavourings can be used and may vary widely by taste and locality. Demerara sugar, golden syrup, Greek yoghurt and honey are common. Cold milk or single cream may be used.

Rice

 Rice porridge:
 Champorado, a sweet chocolate rice porridge in Filipino cuisine. It is traditionally made by boiling sticky rice with cocoa powder, giving it a distinctly brown color and usually with milk and sugar to make it taste sweeter.
 Congee, a common East Asian, Southeast Asian and South Asian dish of boiled-down rice:
 In Bangladesh congee is prepared simply as a porridge, Whole rice (not parboiled, scented or unscented) with a bit of salt, it is known as "Jao" eaten as wholesome diet for the sick. Added date tree sugar and garam masala it is called "Kheer", Or, cooked with Sugar, Milk, nuts & raisins, cardamom, Cassia, cinnamon, Indian bay leaf, etc. it is called "Paiesh". Both "Kheer" & "Paiesh" are eaten as Dessert.
 In Sri Lanka congee is prepared with many ingredients. As a porridge, Sinhala people mainly use coconut milk with rice flour, it is known as "Kiriya."
 Chinese congee, called zhou in Mandarin, and juk in Cantonese, can be served with a century egg, salted duck egg, pork, cilantro, fried wonton noodles or you tiao, deep-fried dough strips. Meiling porridge (Meiling zhou 美齡粥) made of rice, yam and soya-milk, named after Soong Mei-ling, is a classic dish of Nanjing.
 Indonesian and Malaysian congee, called bubur, comes in many regional varieties, such as bubur sumsum, made from rice flour boiled with coconut milk then served with palm sugar sauce; and also bubur manado or tinutuan, a rice porridge mixed with various vegetables and eaten with fried salted fish and chili sauce. There is also congee made from mung beans, called bubur kacang hijau or congee with chicken called bubur ayam
 Japanese congee, called kayu, is mixed with salt and green onions. Often accompanied with variety of foods such as tsukemono (preserved vegetables), shiokara (preserved seafoods) and so on.
 Korean congee, called juk, can have added seafood, pine nuts, mushrooms, etc.
 Thai congee, called "khao tom" (ข้าวต้ม), or "Jok" (โจ๊ก), can have added coriander, preserved duck eggs, fish sauce, sliced chili peppers, pickled mustard greens or salt cabbage preserves, red pepper flakes, etc.
 Vietnamese congee, called cháo, can be made with beef or chicken stock and contains fish sauce and ginger. It is often served with scallions and fried sticks of bread.
 Filipino congee, called lugaw or arroz caldo, contains saffron, ginger and sometimes meat. Less common ingredients include boiled eggs, pepper, chilies, puto, lumpiang toge, tofu, fish sauce, calamansi sauce, toyo and spring onions. It is common as a street food.
 Cream of Rice, a brand of American rice porridge, boiled in milk or water with sugar or salt.
 Ambrosia Creamed Rice, a brand of UK rice pudding, made of rice and milk/cream, since 1937.
 Kheer (or Ksheer), a traditional Indian sweet dish, made of rice boiled in milk.
 Frescarelli, an Italian dish made of overcooked rice and white flour, typical of Marche.
 Orez în lapte (Romania), a dessert made with rice boiled in milk with sugar, sometimes flavored with cinnamon, jam, cocoa powder, etc.
 Tejberizs (Hungary), made with milk

Sorghum
 Sorghum porridge:
 Mabela, a sorghum porridge eaten typically for breakfast in South Africa and Zimbabwe. Maltabella is a brand name for a sorghum porridge manufactured by Bokomo Foods
 Tolegi, a sorghum porridge eaten as a midday meal during the summer in New Guinea.
 Tuwo or ogi, a Nigerian sorghum porridge that may also be made from maize.

Wheat

 Wheat porridge:
 Cream of Wheat, a brand of American wheat porridge, boiled in milk or water with sugar or salt; also called farina or "hot cereal" (a term also applied to oat porridge).
 Dalia, a simple porridge made out of cracked wheat, is a common breakfast in northern India and Pakistan. It is cooked in milk or water and eaten with salt or sugar added.
 Frumenty, a boiled wheat porridge eaten in Roman times, sometimes with fruit or meat added.
 Gris cu lapte (Romania), dessert made with semolina boiled in milk with sugar added, sometimes flavored with jam, raisins, dried fruit, cinnamon powder, etc.
 Tejbegríz (Hungary), semolina dessert cooked with milk, usually with sugar and topped with cocoa or cinnamon powder, etc.
 Malt-O-Meal – a brand of American wheat porridge
 Mannapuuro, a traditional Finnish dessert made with semolina.
 Semolina porridge, eaten in Czech Republic, Slovakia and Croatia, is made of milk, semolina and sugar.
 Sour cream porridge, a Norwegian porridge of wheat flour in cooked sour cream with a very smooth and slightly runny texture. It is served with sugar, cinnamon, cured meats or even hard-boiled eggs depending on local custom.
 Upma, a fried semolina porridge traditional in southern India, flavored with clarified butter, fried onions, toasted mustard seeds and curry leaves and often mixed with vegetables and other foods, such as potatoes, fried dried red chilis, fried cauliflower and toasted peanuts or cashew nuts.
 Velvet porridge or butter porridge, a Norwegian dish: a generous amount of white roux is made from wheat flour and butter, adding milk until it can be served as a thick porridge.
 Wheatena, a brand name for a whole-wheat porridge.
 Ýarma, a Turkmen wheat groat porridge.
 Harees, a Middle Eastern dish of boiled, cracked or coarsely-ground wheat and meat or chicken. Its consistency varies between a porridge and a dumpling. Harees is a popular dish in the Persian Gulf countries, Armenia and Pakistan.

Other
 Brenntar, made of a specially roasted flour (Musmehl). Particularly prominent in the Swabian Jura and in the Allgäu.
 Flax porridge, often served as part of a mixture with wheat and rye meal. Red River Cereal and Sunny Boy Cereal are common brands in Canada.
 Kasha, a widely consumed groats/porridge range of dishes, utilising a variety of grains, widespread in Eastern Europe and Russia.
 English speakers frequently reserve the term "kasha" for buckwheat porridge, made of buckwheat in butter, as eaten by many people in Russia and Ukraine, with yoghurt more common in the Caucasus.
 Terci de hrișcă, buckwheat porridge from Romania.
 Mixed grain and legumes in Ethiopia:
 Genfo is a thick porridge made by lightly roasting, milling and cooking any combination of Ethiopian oats, wheat, barley, sorghum, millet, maize, chickpeas, yellow peas, soybeans, or bulla, the starch from the root of the false banana tree; it is traditionally eaten for breakfast with a dollop of clarified, spiced butter (kibe) or oil and chili-spice mix berbere, or with yoghurt. For those who can afford it, it is a popular holiday or Sunday breakfast dish and is often given to pregnant women and women after birthing to bring them back to health and strength.
 Atmit, Muk or Adja is a thinner version of Genfo porridge for drinking, mixed often with spiced, clarified butter, milk and honey, or on its own with a pinch of salt. It is popular in the rainy season and for nursing the sick back to health.
 Besso, made of roasted and ground barley is a popular snack for travellers and, in olden times, foot soldiers. The powder is either mixed with a bit of water, salt and chili powder to make a thick bread-like snack or mixed with more water or milk and honey for drinking. The Gurage and other southern tribes in Ethiopia ferment the Besso for a few days with water and a bit of sugar, add a pinch of salt and chili and drink it as a fortifying and energising meal-in-a-drink.
 Multigrain Porridge
 This consists of roasted rice, wheat, roasted gram, jowar, maize, millet, groundnut, cashewnut, corn, barley and ragi and is prepared by roasting all the ingredients individually in a pan without using any ghee or oil, then grinding them together into a coarse powder.
 This porridge is described as being rich in protein and good for children.
 Pease porridge or peasemeal porridge, made from dried peas, is a traditional English and Scottish porridge.
 Potato porridge, eaten in Norway, is a thick, almost solid paste made from cooked potatoes mixed with milk and barley.
 Helmipuuro ("pearl porridge") is a porridge made from grains of potato starch swelled in milk into ca. five-mm "pearls", traditionally found in Russia and Finland.
 Quinoa porridge.
 Rye porridge:
 Rugmelsgrød, a traditional dinner of the Danish island Bornholm, made of ryemeal and water.
 Ruispuuro, a traditional Finnish breakfast.
 Spelt porridge.
 Tsampa is a toasted grain flour, usually barley, eaten in Tibet, often mixed with tea and butter.
 Yam porridge/pottage
 In Nigeria the words porridge and pottage are synonymous, and it is consumed as a main meal. Nigerian yam porridge/pottage includes tomatoes and other culinary vegetables along with the yam. It may also have fish or other meat.

History

Historically, porridge was a staple food in much of the world, including Europe, Africa and Asia, and it remains a staple food in many parts of the world, it becoming commonplace in agricultural societies that practice grain cultivation starting from the Neolithic period and onward. The dish has traditionally been closely associated with Scotland, possibly because oats can be successfully cultivated on marginal upland soils. In 1775, Dr. Samuel Johnson wrote that oats were "a grain which in England is generally given to horses, but in Scotland supports the people". Oats were introduced to Scotland in about 600 AD; traces of barley porridge have been found in pots excavated in the Outer Hebrides which have been dated to 2,500 years ago.

Northern Europe

Historically, porridge was a staple food in much of Northern Europe and Russia. It was often made from barley, though other grains and yellow peas could be used, depending on local conditions. It was primarily a savoury dish, with meats, root crops, vegetables and herbs added for flavor. Porridge could be cooked in a large metal kettle over hot coals or heated in a cheaper earthenware container by adding hot stones until boiling hot. Until leavened bread and baking ovens became commonplace in Europe, porridge was a typical means of preparing cereal crops for the table.

Porridge was also commonly used as prison breakfast for inmates in the British prison system during the 19th century and early 20th century, and so "doing porridge" became a slang term for a sentence in prison.

See also

 Asida, from the Arabian cuisine
 Barley gruel
 Congee, a rice porridge common across Asia
 , a traditional Dutch porridge-like dessert
 List of porridges
 Macroom Oatmeal, the last traditionally stone-ground oatmeal in Ireland
 Quaker Oats, large multinational manufacturer, suppliers of Quaker Oats, Quaker Instant Oatmeal, etc.
 Ready Brek, a British brand of instant shredded oat cereal
 Scott's Porage Oats, a Scottish brand producing porridge sold nationally in the UK.
 Stoats Porridge Bars, a Scottish brand comprising porridge bars, organic porridge, oats, health food and oat bars.
 Tapioca pudding
 African cuisine
 List of African dishes

References

External links

 

 
Scottish cuisine
World cuisine
Types of food
Breakfast cereals
Oat-based dishes